Manconi Soriano "Sori" Mané (born 3 April 1996) is a Bissau-Guinean professional footballer who plays as a defensive midfielder or a central defender for Portuguese club Moreirense FC.

Club career
Mané was born in Bissau. He finished his youth career in Italy, with U.C. Sampdoria.

In late 2015, Mané was loaned to Portuguese club S.C. Olhanense. He made his LigaPro debut on 31 January 2016, featuring the first half of the 1–0 away loss against Atlético Clube de Portugal. His first goal came also that season, in a 2–0 away victory over Leixões S.C. on 8 May.

Mané continued in the Portuguese second division the following years, with Olhanense and C.D. Cova da Piedade. On 11 July 2019, he signed a four-year contract with Moreirense F.C. of the Primeira Liga. He played his first match in the competition on 11 August, starting the 3–1 defeat at S.C. Braga.

Mané spent the vast majority of the 2020–21 season on the sidelines, due to a knee injury.

International career
Mané made his debut for the Guinea-Bissau national team on 25 March 2017, in a 3–1 friendly loss to South Africa where he came on as an injury-time substitute. He was part of the squad that participated in the 2019 Africa Cup of Nations.

References

External links

Portuguese League profile 

1996 births
Living people
Sportspeople from Bissau
Bissau-Guinean footballers
Association football defenders
Association football midfielders
Association football utility players
U.C. Sampdoria players
Primeira Liga players
Liga Portugal 2 players
S.C. Olhanense players
C.D. Cova da Piedade players
Moreirense F.C. players
Guinea-Bissau international footballers
2019 Africa Cup of Nations players
2021 Africa Cup of Nations players
Bissau-Guinean expatriate footballers
Expatriate footballers in Italy
Expatriate footballers in Portugal
Bissau-Guinean expatriate sportspeople in Italy
Bissau-Guinean expatriate sportspeople in Portugal